Richard Thomas Bennett (born 23 March 1991) is an English professional footballer who plays as a forward for  club Scunthorpe United, on loan from  club Barrow.

Having left the youth-team at Oldham Athletic at the age of 15, he began his career in non-league football with Springhead, Curzon Ashton, Mossley, Northwich Victoria and Barrow. His 22 goals in 53 appearances for Barrow during the 2016–17 season earned him a move to Carlisle United in July 2017, meaning he first entered the Football League at the age of 26. He was loaned out to Morecambe in January 2019 and left Carlisle for Port Vale in June 2019. He was sold on to Stockport County in March 2020. He briefly joined Hartlepool United on loan in April 2021 and then signed with Football League newcomers Sutton United three months later. He played for Sutton on the losing side in the 2022 EFL Trophy final and was sold on to Barrow in June 2022. From Barrow, he was loaned out to Scunthorpe United in March 2023.

Career

Early career
Bennett joined the youth-team at Oldham Athletic at the age of ten, and left Boundary Park five years later. He went on to make his debut in the Manchester League for Springhead at the age of 16. He moved on to Curzon Ashton the next year, before being signed to Northern Premier League Division One North side Mossley in November 2013. He scored eight goals in 22 games during the second half of the 2013–14 season. He signed with Northwich Victoria, where he was christened "Richie" by manager Jim Gannon, having previously only been known as Richard or Rich. He scored 44 goals in two seasons with the "Vics" and helped them to win the 2014 Cheshire Senior Cup. During his time playing as an amateur and semi-professional he worked in customer sales for Marks & Spencer, in a call centre and also a spell as a care assistant working with dementia sufferers. He also became a father at the age of 17.

Barrow
On 17 May 2016, Bennett signed a two-year contract at National League club Barrow. It was reported that he opted to go to Holker Street ahead of competition from League Two clubs. He went on to score 22 goals in 53 games as Paul Cox's "Bluebirds" finished the 2016–17 season in seventh-position, just missing out on the play-offs.

Carlisle United
On 25 July 2017, 26-year old Bennett signed for Football League side Carlisle United for an undisclosed fee (later reported to be £50,000) on a two-year contract. Bennett stated that "I think I'm ready for the step up... I've still got a lot to prove, a lot to learn but I'm more than willing to get my head down and do it." On 30 September, he was one of three players sent off in a 1–0 defeat at Crawley Town; he was shown a straight red card for elbowing defender Josh Yorwerth. It took him 15 games before he scored for the "Cumbrians", but credited the support of his teammates and manager Keith Curle in helping him to break his scoring duck. His first goal for the club came on 28 October, in a 2–2 draw at Chesterfield. On 4 November, he scored a brace in a 3–2 FA Cup victory over former club Oldham. He ended the 2017–18 season with eight goals in 47 appearances.

Having been limited to 13 league starts by new manager John Sheridan, Bennett signed for Morecambe on loan for the rest of the 2018–19 season on 17 January 2019; "Shrimps" boss Jim Bentley admitted he had been monitoring the player for some years. David Holdsworth, director of football at the "Blues", said that Carlisle would monitor his progress and still retained the option of extending his contract at Brunton Park in the summer. He scored five goals in 16 games at the Globe Arena, however was not retained at the end of the season by new Carlisle manager Steven Pressley.

Port Vale
On 21 June 2019, Bennett signed a two-year contract with League Two side Port Vale. Manager John Askey said that he hoped having Bennett available to him would take pressure off star striker Tom Pope. He scored his first goal for the "Valiants" on 17 August, three minutes after coming on for Pope in a 1–1 draw at Salford City. Three days later he was given his first start for the club and this time scored after four minutes in what ended as a 2–1 victory over Forest Green Rovers at Vale Park. He lost his first-team spot in late-November to Pope and then Mark Cullen, before scoring a brace in a 3–1 home win over Exeter City on 28 January in what was his second league start in two months; despite this achievement Bennett admitted that "it probably wasn't my best performance. I have a lot to improve, I know that myself". He left the club mid-way through the 2019–20 season after scoring seven goals from 30 games.

Stockport County
On 12 March 2020, Bennett signed a two-and-a-half year contract with Stockport County after being sold for an undisclosed fee, who were just outside the National League play-offs under former Northwich manager Jim Gannon. He found himself out of the team after Simon Rusk replaced Gannon as manager in January 2021.

On 1 April 2021, Bennett signed on loan for National League rivals Hartlepool United until the end of the 2020–21 season. Bennett made his debut the following day as a substitute in a 2–1 win against Dagenham & Redbridge. Bennett scored his first goal for Hartlepool in the following match as a substitute in a 2–2 draw at Boreham Wood. Bennett earned a start for the next match against Notts County and scored his second goal for Hartlepool in a 2–0 win. The following week, Bennett scored a hat-trick in a 7–2 victory at Wealdstone. He was recalled to Stockport on 28 April. He played for Stockport against Hartlepool in the play-off semi-finals and had a late header saved in a 1–0 defeat at Edgeley Park. Hartlepool went on to win the play-off final and Bennett had his contract with Stockport cancelled in June.

Sutton United
On 9 July 2021, Bennett signed a contract of undisclosed length with newly-promoted League Two club Sutton United. He scored both the "U's" goals in a 2–1 win over Stevenage at Gander Green Lane on 11 September, which was Sutton's first victory in the English Football League. On 23 October, he was sent off for a stamp on Rochdale's Jake Beesley in a 3–2 away defeat. Matt Gray's "U's" finished the League Two campaign one place outside the play-offs, with Bennett scoring six league goals from 22 starts and 16 substitute appearances. He also played in all eight games of Sutton's run to the final of the EFL Trophy at Wembley Stadium, and scored a penalty in the shoot-out victory over Wigan Athletic in the semi-finals. He played in the final, coming on as an 82nd-minute substitute for Omar Bugiel with Sutton leading 2–1; however, Rotherham United equalised deep into stoppage time and won the match 4–2 in extra-time.

Return to Barrow
On 27 June 2022, Bennett returned to Barrow – now in League Two and managed by Pete Wild – on a two-year contract after being signed for an undisclosed fee. However he picked up an injury during pre-season and was sidelined until November. On 2 March 2023, he joined National League club Scunthorpe United on loan until the end of the 2022–23 season. Scunthorpe had recently underwent a takeover and signed eleven new players.

Style of play
Describing his own game, he said that "I would like to say I'm aggressive, quick - one of them annoying strikers that doesn't really give you time to think about what you are doing on the ball".

Career statistics

Honours
Northwich Victoria
Cheshire Senior Cup: 2014

Sutton United
EFL Trophy runner-up: 2022

References

1991 births
Living people
Footballers from Oldham
English footballers
Association football forwards
Oldham Athletic A.F.C. players
Curzon Ashton F.C. players
Mossley A.F.C. players
Northwich Victoria F.C. players
Barrow A.F.C. players
Carlisle United F.C. players
Port Vale F.C. players
Stockport County F.C. players
Hartlepool United F.C. players
Sutton United F.C. players
Scunthorpe United F.C. players
Northern Premier League players
National League (English football) players
English Football League players